"Love Lessons" is a song written by Jerry Kilgore, Monty Powell, Ted Hewitt and Sarah Majors, and recorded by American country music artist Tracy Byrd.  It was released in August 1995 as the second single and title track from the album Love Lessons.  The song reached #9 on the Billboard Hot Country Singles & Tracks chart.

Critical reception
Larry Flick, of Billboard magazine reviewed the song favorably, saying that Byrd slows the pace to deliver "a pretty, romantic ballad." He goes on to say that "Byrd's smooth, rich voice and Brown's solid production make this one a winner."

Chart performance

References

1995 singles
1995 songs
Tracy Byrd songs
Songs written by Jerry Kilgore (singer)
Songs written by Monty Powell
Song recordings produced by Tony Brown (record producer)
Music videos directed by Deaton-Flanigen Productions
MCA Records singles
Songs written by Ted Hewitt
Black-and-white music videos